Bucoli is a suco (municipality) in Baucau Subdistrict, Baucau District, East Timor and also a settlement in the Bucoli Suco. As of 2010 there were 2179 inhabitants and 372 households in Bucoli Suco. 85% in Bucoli speak the Waima'a language as their mother tongue.

Bucoli was the home of guerrilla warrior Vicente dos Reis and has a symbolic status in East Timorese nationalism. National Unity of Timorese Resistance (Portuguese: União Nacional Democrática de Resistência Timorense (UNDERTIM)) chose to establish its first headquarters in Bucoli in 2005 because of the role of the village in the history of the East Timorese resistance movement.

References

Baucau Municipality